12th Ohio Battery was an artillery battery that served in the Union Army during the American Civil War.

Service
The 12th Ohio Battery was created from Company G, 25th Ohio Infantry Regiment (which originally entered service on July 27, 1861) and permanently detached on March 17, 1862, under Captain Aaron C. Johnson.

The battery was attached to Milroy's Independent Brigade, Department of the Mountains, to June 1862. Milroy's Independent Brigade, I Corps, Army of Virginia, to September 1862. Artillery, 2nd Division, XI Corps, Army of the Potomac, to January 1863. Provost Guard, Army of the Potomac, to May 1863. Unattached, Artillery Reserve, Army of the Potomac, to June 1863. Camp Barry, Defenses of Washington, D.C., XXII Corps, to September 1863. Artillery Brigade, XI Corps, Army of the Cumberland, to December 1863. 2nd Division, Artillery Reserve, Department of the Cumberland, to April 1864. Garrison Artillery, Murfreesboro, Tennessee, Department of the Cumberland, to July 1864. 1st Brigade, Defenses Nashville & Chattanooga Railroad, Department of the Cumberland, to July 1865.

The 12th Ohio Battery mustered out of service on July 12, 1865.

Detailed service
Prior to being detached as artillery the company was ordered to western Virginia July 29, 1861, and attached to 1st Brigade, Army of Occupation West Virginia, to November 1861, then attached to Milroy's Cheat Mountain District, West Virginia, to March, 1862.  It performed duty along the Baltimore & Ohio Railroad from Grafton to the Ohio River until August 21, 1861. Moved to Cheat Mountain Summit August 21. Action at Cheat Mountain September 12–17. Cheat Mountain Pass September 14–15. Greenbrier October 3–4. Moved to Huttonsville November 25, and duty there until February 27, 1862. Expedition to Camp Baldwin December 11–13, 1861. Buffalo Mountain December 12–13. Raid to Huntersville December 31-January 5, 1862. At Elkwater until March.

After being detached as artillery, the battery participated in the expedition on the Seneca April 1–12. At Staunton to May 7. Battle of McDowell May 8. Franklin May 10–12. Battle of Cross Keys June 8. Pope's Campaign in northern Virginia August 16-September 2. Fords of the Rappahannock August 21–23. Freeman's Ford and Hazel Run August 22. Battle of Groveton August 29. Second Battle of Bull Run August 30. Duty in the defenses of Washington, D.C., until December. Moved to Fredericksburg, Va., December 12–16. "Mud March" January 20–24, 1863. Chancellorsville Campaign April 27-May 6. Duty in the defenses of Washington, D.C., until September. Moved to Bridgeport, Ala., September 25-October 6. Garrison duty at Nashville, Tenn., until April 1864, and at Murfreesboro, Tenn., until July 1865. Defenses of Murfreesboro December 5–12, 1864. Wilkinson's Pike December 7.

Casualties
The battery lost a total of 20 enlisted men during service; 3 enlisted men killed or mortally wounded, 17 enlisted men died due to disease.

Commanders
 Captain Aaron C. Johnson

See also

 List of Ohio Civil War units
 Ohio in the Civil War

References
 Dyer, Frederick H.  A Compendium of the War of the Rebellion (Des Moines, IA:  Dyer Pub. Co.), 1908.
 Ohio Roster Commission. Official Roster of the Soldiers of the State of Ohio in the War on the Rebellion, 1861–1865, Compiled Under the Direction of the Roster Commission (Akron, OH: Werner Co.), 1886–1895.
 Reid, Whitelaw. Ohio in the War: Her Statesmen, Her Generals, and Soldiers (Cincinnati, OH: Moore, Wilstach, & Baldwin), 1868. 
Attribution

External links
 Ohio in the Civil War: 12th Ohio Battery by Larry Stevens

Military units and formations established in 1862
Military units and formations disestablished in 1865
Units and formations of the Union Army from Ohio
O
1862 establishments in Ohio